Cherry Bekaert (formerly Cherry, Bekaert & Holland L.L.P.) is  an accounting firm based in Raleigh, North Carolina. It has offices in California, Maryland, Virginia, Washington, D.C., Florida, Georgia, North Carolina, Rhode Island, Texas, Tennessee, and South Carolina, Employing over 1,350 people, Cherry Bekaert reported revenues of $250 million in 2021.

History

Cherry Bekaert began in 1947 as a small practice in Wilmington, North Carolina, led by Harry Cherry. Charles Bekaert and William Holland joined the Firm in 1952 and 1953 respectively. The firm moved into the Richmond, Virginia, area in 1988, eventually relocating the corporate headquarters to Richmond from Charlotte in 1991. 

In February 2013, Cherry Bekaert & Holland LLP launched a strategic rebranding initiative under the new name of Cherry Bekaert LLP. As part of the rebranding, Cherry Bekaert introduced its new tagline, "Your Guide Forward."

Beginning May 1, 2018, Michelle Thompson succeeded Howard Kies as Cherry Bekaert's Firm Managing Partner and Chief Executive Officer. Kies served as the firm's CEO and Firm Managing Partner for 27 years prior to Thompson's appointment.

The firm acquired Powell, Ebert & Smolik of Austin in 2018, and in January 2019, Cherry Bekaert announced the acquisition of Flieller, Kruger & Skelton, also in Austin. 

In February 2020, Cherry Bekaert LLP announced the acquisition of Icimo LLC, an analytics firm based in Raleigh. In July 2020, the firm acquired PMB Helin Donovan.

In November 2021, Cherry Bekaert acquired TaxGroup Partners,  a national private equity and transaction tax advisory firm based in California. In 2022, the firm moves its headquarters to Raleigh, North Carolina.

On June 30, 2022, Cherry Bekaert announced Parthenon Capital will investment in the Firm’s business advisory practices. Cherry Bekaert will be the overall brand name. Cherry Bekaert LLP, a licensed CPA firm, will provide attest services and Cherry Bekaert Advisory LLC will provide business advisory and non-attest services.

Industries
Cherry Bekaert is divided into ten industry groups:
Government & Public Sector,
Government Contractors,
Healthcare & Life Sciences,
Industrial Manufacturing,
Not-for-Profits,
Private Equity,
Professional Services,
Real Estate & Construction,
Hospitality & Retail, and
Technology.

Awards
Cherry Bekaert has been recognized as one of the "Best Places to Work" by job search site Vault.com; Inside Business in Hampton Roads, VA; Triangle Business Journal in Raleigh, NC; and Tampa Bay Business Journal in Tampa Bay, FL. Tableau Software, the leader in visual analytics, on February 26, 2020, awarded Icimo Analytics, by Cherry Bekaert the 2019 Partner of the Year for the Americas – Creating Customers for Life Award. In 2022, Cherry Bekaert was awarded the following: 2021 Top Data Visualiztion Consulting/Service Companies, M&A Atlas Due Diligence & Valuation Firm of the Year, Vault Ranking - 100 Best Internships and Best Internships by Industry – Accounting, and Atlanta's Fastest Growing Accounting firm. Cherry Bekaert was nominated as a 2022 America’s Best Tax and Accounting Firm by Forbes.

References

External links
 
 Allinial Global Official Website
 Cherry Bekaert LLP Wealth Management Official Website

Accounting firms of the United States
Management consulting firms of the United States
Companies based in Raleigh, North Carolina
American companies established in 1947